The 21st Bangladesh National Film Awards, presented by Ministry of Information, Bangladesh to felicitate the best of Bangladeshi Cinema released in the year 1996. The ceremony took place in Dhaka and awards were given by the President of Bangladesh. The National Film Awards are the only film awards given by the government itself. Every year, a national panel appointed by the government selects the winning entry, and the award ceremony is held in Dhaka. 1996 was the 21st ceremony of National Film Awards.

List of winners
This year artists received awards in 13 categories. No awards were given in Best Actress in a Supporting Role, Best Female Playback Singer, Best Art Direction, and Best Cinematography categories in 1996.

Merit Awards

Technical Awards

See also
Meril Prothom Alo Awards
Ifad Film Club Award
Babisas Award

References

External links

National Film Awards (Bangladesh) ceremonies
1996 film awards
1997 awards in Bangladesh
1997 in Dhaka